Qez Qabri-ye Ebrahim (also Romanized as Qez Qabrī-ye Ebrāhīm and Qez Qebrī-ye Ebrāhīm; also known as Qez Qebrī-ye Yek) is a village in Baladarband Rural District, in the Central District of Kermanshah County, Kermanshah Province, Iran. At the 2006 census, its population was 130, in 27 families.

References 

Populated places in Kermanshah County